Mandy Wong Chi-man (born 21 December 1982) is a Hong Kong actress contracted to TVB.

Wong began her acting career by participating in the Miss Hong Kong 2007 beauty pageant, where she was placed among the top 5 finalists. She gained recognition with her performance in the 2012 dramas L'Escargot and The Hippocratic Crush, winning the Most Improved Female Artiste award at the 2012 TVB Anniversary Awards.
In 2018, Wong earned critical acclaim for her performance in the legal comedy Threesome, winning the Favourite TVB Actress awards in both Malaysia and Singapore at the 2018 TVB 51st Anniversary Gala.

Early and personal life
Born in Hong Kong, Mandy Wong was raised in a single-parent household and graduated from Cognitio College (Kowloon). Wong is very fond of dancing and has been practising since her teenage years. She had also achieved grade 8 on the piano. She has an older sister, Cathy Wong, who was a former English language specialist at King's Glory Education Centre. Their mother is the owner of a cosmetics boutique in Wan Chai.

Wong is best friends with Myolie Wu, Nancy Wu, Paisley Wu, Elaine Yiu and Selena Lee. They had formed the friendship group “胡說八道會” and had filmed a travel show together. Another best friend of her is Candice Chiu, whom Wong refers to as her “soul sister”. Wong is also good friends with Benjamin Yuen, Kenneth Ma, Joel Chan, Vincent Wong, Him Law, Lokyi Lai, Shaun Tam, Ali Lee, Venus Wong and Yoyo Chen due to collaborations in filming television dramas. She is good friends with The Exorcist's Meter co-actors Hubert Wu and Anthony Ho as well. They formed the friendship group “降魔的偷跳小隊”  

Due to their common interest in long-distance running, Wong along with Benjamin Yuen, Joel Chan, Brian Tse, Jack Wu, Nancy Wu, Paisley Wu, Elaine Yiu and Selena Lee formed the group “Crazy Runner”.

Wong's boyfriend is Anthony Jim, a C-level of TSL Jewellery Ltd. They have been dating since 2012.

Career

2008-2011: Career Beginning
As a former graduate of The Hong Kong Academy for Performing Arts, Mandy Wong worked as a flight attendant for three years before participating in the Miss Hong Kong 2007 beauty pageant, in which she was placed among the top 5 finalists. Wong was offered an artiste contract by TVB, upon graduating from its acting class in 2008, and debuted with an uncredited appearance in the sitcom Best Selling Secrets.

After two years of appearing in dramas as minor supporting roles, Wong received attention with her role as "So Fung-lin", the bespectacled younger sister of Myolie Wu's character in the 2009 comedy drama A Chip Off the Old Block. Impressed with her character portrayal, producer Poon Ka-tak cast Wong to portray "Cheng Siu-man", the timid younger sister of Flora Chan's character in the 2010 romantic comedy drama Suspects in Love, again receiving attention from netizens. To prepare for her role, Wong studied Maggie Cheung's performance in Police Cadet '84. Since then, she had frequently collaborated with producer Poon Ka-tak and had been cast in his dramas with major roles.

In 2011, Wong earned her first nomination for the Most Improved Female Artiste at the 2011 TVB Anniversary Awards.

2012-2015: Gaining Recognition
In 2012, Wong's popularity further rose and was highly praised by netizens with her role as "Lau Siu-lan", the overbearing wife of Oscar Leung's character in the family drama L'Escargot, for which she won My Favourite Most Promising Female Artiste award at the 2012 MY AOD Favourites Awards. She also earned her first Best Supporting Actress nomination at the 2012 TVB Anniversary Awards and was placed among top 2. In the critical acclaimed medical drama The Hippocratic Crush, Wong played the medical intern "Hung Mei-suet", starring opposite Kenneth Ma and Tavia Yeung. She played the SDU member "So Man-keung" in the drama Tiger Cubs. In the comedy drama Divas in Distress, she collaborated with veterans Liza Wang and Gigi Wong. With her performance in 2012, Wong gained recognition by winning the Most Improved Female Artiste award at the 2012 TVB Anniversary Awards and has become one of the Next-Gen Fadans at TVB.

In 2013, Wong starred in the romance drama Always and Ever as the younger sister of Esther Kwan's character, which was her first villainous role and the producer had publicly praised her performance. Through the sequel The Hippocratic Crush II, Wong reprised her role as the neurosurgeon "Hung Mei-suet", for which she won one of the Top 15 Favourite TVB Drama Characters award at the 2013 TVB Star Awards Malaysia.

In 2014, Wong reprised her role as "So Man-keung" in the sequel Flying Tiger II, for which she garnered her first nomination for Most Popular Female Character at the 2014 TVB Anniversary Awards.

In 2015, Wong played her first female leading role in the crime drama The Fixer, for which she gained her first Best Actress nomination at the 2015 TVB Anniversary Awards. She also won one of the Top 16 Favourite TVB Drama Characters award at the 2015 TVB Star Awards Malaysia (which was her second win in this category). In the same year, she starred in her first ancient drama, Captain of Destiny.

2016-present: Established Lead Actress
In 2016, Wong starred in the family drama Daddy Dearest as the first female lead. In the legal drama Law dis-Order, Wong played "Martha Fong", an astute lawyer, starring opposite veteran actors Alex Fong and Liu Kai Chi. With this role, she won one of the Top 15 Favourite TVB Drama Characters award (which was her third win in this category) at the 2016 TVB Star Awards Malaysia, as well as earning her first nomination for the Favourite TVB Actress and was placed among top 5. She also won one of My Favourite TVB Female Character award at the 2016 StarHub TVB Awards.

In 2017, Wong starred as the first female lead in two dramas. In the crime drama Nothing Special Force, she played a pregnant cause-of-death inspector, for which she won one of My Favourite TVB Female Character award at the 2017 StarHub TVB Awards (which was her second win in this category). In the same year, Wong starred in the critically acclaimed supernatural drama The Exorcist's Meter, playing "Chong Tsz-yeuk", a kind-hearted A&E doctor, and a devil named "Salvia". With her role as "Dr. Chong", Wong was placed among top 5 for the Most Popular Female Character at the 2017 TVB Anniversary Awards. In addition, she was nominated for the Best Actress in the 2017 People's Choice TV Awards by audience and netizens, eventually ranking 2nd in the category.

In 2018, Wong starred as the first female lead in the legal comedy Threesome, She portrayed "Evie Fong", a competitive barrister with dissociative identity disorder, along with her two other personalities, the wild "Piña Colada" and the pessimistic "Sau Mak Mak". To prepare for her role, Wong had done research, watched numerous film and television work, and read books related to dissociative identity disorder. She earned critical acclaim from the public with her performance and netizens supported her to win the Best Actress award. Wong became the first TVB artiste featured on NASDAQ MarketSite at New York Times Square and was invited as a special guest at the 17th Miss Chinese Beauty Pageant 2018 Final, which was held in August. Wong's outstanding performance in Threesome earned her the Favourite TVB Actress awards in both Malaysia and Singapore at the 2018 TVB 51st Anniversary Gala. In her acceptance speech, Wong said, “I still firmly believe, that one’s effort may not necessarily be rewarded, but as long as we are willing to work hard, someone will see it.” She became a strong contender for the Best Actress award at the 2018 TVB Anniversary Awards, eventually placed among top 5 in both the Best Actress and Most Popular Female Character nominations. In addition, Wong won the 2018 People's Choice TV Awards for the Best Actress award and the 2018 Hong Kong Television Awards for the Best Leading Actress in Drama Series award, which served as a public recognition, as all awardees were 100% voted for by audience and netizens.

In 2019, Wong starred in the comedy drama My Life As Loan Shark as a passionate social worker, collaborating with veterans Kent Cheng, Kingdom Yuen, Maggie Shiu.

In 2020, Wong starred as the first female lead in three dramas. She first starred in the crime drama Brutally Young. Due to her character's tragic experience, Wong took half a year to emotionally withdraw from her character after filming the drama. In the sequel The Exorcist's 2nd Meter, she reprised her role as "Chong Tsz-yeuk", for which she won the Best Actress award in the hk01 Television Drama Awards with over 400 votes from netizens. In the same year, Wong starred in the crime drama Line Walker: Bull Fight, playing "Cheung Kei-gee (Madam G)", a Chief Inspector of Police with Savant Syndrome and Asperger Syndrome, for which she was praised for her profound portrayal of the character. Again, she became a strong contender for the Best Actress award at the 2020 TVB Anniversary Awards, eventually being placed among top 5 in the category again.

In 2021, Wong starred in the crime thriller Murder Diary as "Yau Ngan-sing (Madam Sing)", the “Number One” Bomb Disposal Officer from the Explosive Ordnance Disposal Bureau. During filming, she was required to wear a bomb suit weighing 80 pounds and a 20-pound helmet. In the same year, Wong starred in the drama The Line Watchers as the first female lead. She played "Yan Kwan (Madam Kwan)", a Chief Trade Control Officer in the Hong Kong Customs and Excise Department, again pairing up with Benjamin Yuen. In this drama, her portrayal of a mother-to-be who underwent miscarriage was highly praised by netizens. With this role, Wong was placed among the top 5 nominees for the 2021 TVB Anniversary Awards for the Best Actress again.

Variety Shows
In 2017, along with Myolie Wu, Nancy Wu, Paisley Wu, Elaine Yiu and Selena Lee, Mandy Wong filmed a traveling show, The Sisterhood Traveling Gang, in Australia.

In 2019, Wong hosted her first reality TV show, Dancing For a Reason, which was filmed in Seoul, South Korea. In the show, she aspired to become a member of a K-pop girl group. Due to intensive training and the lack of rest, she fell ill and was briefly hospitalised. She was praised by viewers for her dedication and earnestness.

Stage Plays
In January 2020, Mandy Wong made her stage debut in the stage play Let's Hunt for a "Tiger" Tonight, playing the witty and beautiful "Wong Sau-ying".

In May 2021, Wong starred in her second stage play, Larger Than Life, which is directed by the prominent stage director Tang Shu-wing. She played a charming robot named "Chloé". In the stage play, she had to dance Flamenco and perform fencing. Her performance was praised by the co-actors. The international theatre news website BroadwayWorld wrote a review on this stage play, which praised Wong for her convincing imitation of an android and her transition into the endearing Chloé with memories and emotions. Furthermore, she earned her first nomination for Best Actress in Comedy at the 30th Hong Kong Drama Awards.

Filmography

Television dramas (TVB)

Television dramas (Shaw Brothers Pictures)

Television drama (Mainland China)

Films

Television hosts

Stage plays

Awards and nominations

TVB Anniversary Awards

MY AOD Favourites Awards

TVB Star Awards Malaysia

StarHub TVB Awards

Next TV Awards

People's Choice Television Awards

Hong Kong Television Awards

hk01 Television Drama Awards

30th Hong Kong Drama Awards

References

External links
Official TVB Artiste Blog
Mandy Wong's Profile - spcnet.tv
Mandy Wong's Sina Weibo
Mandy Wong's Instagram
Mandy Wong's YouTube Channel

1982 births
Living people
People from Huadu District
TVB actors
Hong Kong television actresses
Hong Kong businesspeople
Alumni of The Hong Kong Academy for Performing Arts
Hong Kong film actresses
21st-century Hong Kong actresses